Peach-O-Reno is a 1931 pre-Production Code comedy film starring Bert Wheeler, Robert Woolsey, Dorothy Lee, and Zelma O'Neal. It was released on Christmas Day of 1931.

A copy is preserved in the Library of Congress collection.

Plot

Aggie Bruno (Cora Witherspoon) has had enough of her husband, Joe (Joseph Cawthorn), and decides to get a divorce in Reno. She meets with lawyers Wattles and Swift (Wheeler and Woolsey), the latter of the two agreeing to represent Aggie in court. Swift suggests that Aggie be "caught" with another man. Meanwhile, Joe Bruno has also headed to Reno, and is being represented in court by Wattles. Wattles suggests that Joe be "caught" with another woman.

Meanwhile, Ace Crosby (Mitchell Harris), an angry Arizona gambler, wants to shoot Wattles for representing his wife in a previous divorce case. Swift suggests that Wattles dress as a woman in order to avoid being found by the gambler. That evening, Wattles and Swift do the same thing that they do every evening: turn their office into a casino. Swift arrives at the casino pretending to be Aggie Bruno's love interest. To add to the confusion, Wattles (dressed as a woman) shows up with Joe Bruno, pretending to be his love interest.

Cast
 Bert Wheeler as Wattles
 Robert Woolsey as Julius Swift
 Dorothy Lee as Prudence Bruno
 Zelma O'Neal as Pansy Bruno
 Joseph Cawthorn as Joe Bruno
 Cora Witherspoon as Aggie Bruno
 Sam Hardy as Judge Jackson
 Mitchell Harris as Ace Crosby, the Gambler
 Arthur Hoyt as Secretary
 Josephine Whittell as Mrs. Doubleday-Doubleday
 Harry Holman as Counselor Jackson #2 (uncredited)
 Frank Darien as Counselor Jackson #3
 Eddie Kane as Radio Announcer in Courtroom (uncredited)
 Monte Collins as Courtroom Vendor (uncredited)

(cast as per AFI database

Production
A rather notorious scene involving a wrestling match between Julis Swift (Robert Woolsey) and Pansy Bruno (Zelma O'Neal) was cut from the film.

Reception
According to RKO records, the film made a profit of $90,000.

Availability
Peach-O-Reno was released with Girl Crazy on DVD by Warner Brothers on December 17, 2010.

References

External links
 
 
 
 

1931 films
1931 musical comedy films
1931 romantic comedy films
American musical comedy films
American romantic comedy films
American romantic musical films
American black-and-white films
RKO Pictures films
Films directed by William A. Seiter
1930s English-language films
1930s American films